Lime Ridge Mall (corporately styled as "CF Lime Ridge") is a two-level indoor shopping mall in Hamilton, Ontario, Canada. Opened on September 13, 1981, it is the largest mall complex in the city, an  super-regional shopping centre with over 213 stores including department stores and big box stores such as Hudson's Bay and the former Sears. It is located on Upper Wentworth Street.

The mall, which includes an office building, is managed by Cadillac Fairview and has four floors of office space. Bell Media radio stations in Hamilton are tenants of the building.

In 1981 the Government of Ontario offered to build an elevated rapid transit line from the Lloyd D. Jackson Square in downtown Hamilton, to the mall. Hamilton turned the proposal down.

Lime Ridge Terminal

The Hamilton Street Railway bus terminal is located on the west side of the mall at Upper Wentworth Street. A total of four routes and two shuttles loop or pass through this terminal.

References
CF Limeridge Mall Website (July 2020): https://www.cfshops.com/lime-ridge.html

External links

Shopping malls in Hamilton, Ontario
Shopping malls established in 1981
Cadillac Fairview